Christian Wilhelm von Schütz (Berlin, 13 April 1776 – Leipzig, 9 August 1847) was a German author.

Biography
Schütz was, among other things, a minor Romantic writer, who first became well-known as a playwright (with Lacrimas, in 1802). A friend of Ludwig Tieck, he translated from 1822 Casanova's Histoire de ma vie for the 12-volume German edition of the notable memoirs. He wrote extensively on political and philosophical topics, earning the attention of Joseph Goebbels. Goebbels wrote his PhD thesis paper on Schütz in 1922. From 1842 to 1846, he was the editor of the Catholic magazine Anticelsus.

Works
 Lacrimas. 1803.
 Niobe. 1807.
 Rußland und Deutschland (Russia and Germany). 1819.
 Deutschlands Preßgesetz (German Press Law). 1821.
 Zur intellectuellen und substantiellen Morphologie (For an intellectual and substantial morphology). 1821 - 1823.
 Lücken der deutschen Philosophie (Gaps in the German philosophy). 1837.
 Über die preußische Rechtsansicht wegen der gemischten Ehen (About the Prussian legal opinion on mixed marriages). 1839.

Works about Schütz
 Friedrich Hiebel: Wilhelm von Schütz. Dissertation, Vienna 1928
 Joseph Goebbels: Wilhelm von Schütz als Dramatiker. Ein Beitrag zur Geschichte des Dramas der Romantischen Schule (Wilhelm von Schütz as Dramatist. A Contribution to the History of Romantic Drama). Dissertation, Heidelberg 1922

1776 births
1847 deaths
Writers of the Romantic era
19th-century German writers
19th-century German male writers
German untitled nobility